Geoffrey Carr (22 January 1886 – 13 July 1969) was a British rowing coxswain who competed in the 1912 Summer Olympics.

Carr was born in Putney and became a member of Thames Rowing Club. He was the coxswain of the Thames Rowing Club coxed four which won the silver medal for Great Britain rowing at the 1912 Summer Olympics.

References

External links
profile

1886 births
1969 deaths
English male rowers
British male rowers
Olympic rowers of Great Britain
People from Putney
Rowers at the 1912 Summer Olympics
Olympic silver medallists for Great Britain
Olympic medalists in rowing
Medalists at the 1912 Summer Olympics
Coxswains (rowing)